Thomas Dickson Armour III (born October 8, 1959) is an American professional golfer.

Armour first joined the PGA Tour in 1981 at the age of 21. He has two career PGA Tour victories, winning the 1990 Phoenix Open and the 2003 Valero Texas Open. Armour previously held the scoring record for best overall 72 hole score (254), which he set with his Valero Texas Open victory in 2003, until it was surpassed in 2017 by Justin Thomas.

Armour is the grandson of three-time major champion Tommy Armour. He lost his Tour card in 2006 due to an injury; Armour finished 110th on the 2007 PGA Tour money list, earning his card for 2008.  He finished his year with a win at the non-PGA Tour sponsored Callaway Golf Pebble Beach Invitational, winning $60,000. In 2008, he finished 62nd on the money list to retain his card for 2009 and was the first repeat champion at the Callaway Golf Pebble Beach Invitational.

He made his Champions Tour debut at The ACE Group Classic in February 2010.

In 2011, despite his Champions Tour status, Armour decided to go to PGA Tour Q School. At 52, he was the oldest player in the field. Armour later withdrew from the tournament.

Professional wins (8)

PGA Tour wins (2)

PGA Tour playoff record (0–1)

Nike Tour wins (2)

Nike Tour playoff record (1–0)

Other wins (4)
1983 Mexican Open
2007 Callaway Golf Pebble Beach Invitational
2008 Callaway Golf Pebble Beach Invitational
2014 Callaway Pebble Beach Invitational

Results in major championships

CUT = missed the half-way cut
"T" indicates a tie for a place

Summary

Most consecutive cuts made – 3 (2004 PGA – 2006 U.S. Open)
Longest streak of top-10s – 0

Results in The Players Championship

CUT = missed the halfway cut
WD = withdrew
"T" indicates a tie for a place

Results in World Golf Championships

"T" = Tied

See also
Fall 1981 PGA Tour Qualifying School graduates
1987 PGA Tour Qualifying School graduates
1994 Nike Tour graduates
1996 PGA Tour Qualifying School graduates
2001 PGA Tour Qualifying School graduates

References

External links

American male golfers
New Mexico Lobos men's golfers
PGA Tour golfers
PGA Tour Champions golfers
Korn Ferry Tour graduates
Golfers from Denver
Golfers from Dallas
Bishop Gorman High School alumni
American people of Scottish descent
1959 births
Living people